Henri Christophe  (1767–1820) also known as Henri I (or Henry I), was a Haitian military leader and king.

People
 Henri Christophe (referee), a Belgian international football referee.